Brenkley is a hamlet and former civil parish about 6 miles from Newcastle upon Tyne, now in the parish of Dinnington, in the Newcastle upon Tyne district, in the county of Tyne and Wear, England. In 1951 the parish had a population of 28.

History 
The name "Brenkley" means 'Brynca's mound' or 'edge mound'. Brenkley is possibly a shrunken medieval village, although there is no indications on the ground. Brenkley is one of the possible sources of the surname Brinkley. Brenkley was formerly a township in the parish of Dinnington, from 1866 Brenkley was a civil parish in its own right until it was abolished on 1 April 1955 and merged with Dinnington, the rest went to form Brunswick. In 1974 it became part of Tyne and Wear, having previously been part of Northumberland.

References 

Hamlets in Tyne and Wear
Former civil parishes in Tyne and Wear
Geography of Newcastle upon Tyne